USS Kalmia may refer to the following ships of the United States Navy:

 , was a screw steamer built as Innes 1863 and purchased by the US Navy the same year and sold 25 October 1865
  was laid down 23 August 1918 and sold 21 January 1947
 , was laid down as ATR-111 on 27 July 1944 and sold to Columbia in 1978

United States Navy ship names